is a railway station in Shimizu-ku Shizuoka City, Shizuoka Prefecture, Japan, operated by Central Japan Railway Company (JR Tōkai).

Lines
Shin-Kambara Station is served by the Tōkaidō Main Line, and is located 152.5 kilometers from the starting point of the line at Tokyo Station.

Station layout
The station has two opposing side platform serving Track 1 and Track 2 The platforms are connected to the station building by a footbridge. The station building has automated ticket machines, TOICA automated turnstiles and a staffed ticket office.

Platforms

Adjacent stations

|-
!colspan=5|Central Japan Railway Company

Station history
Shin-Kambara Station was opened on October 1, 1968, in response to a request by local citizens for a station closer to the center of town than the existing Kambara Station.

Station numbering was introduced to the section of the Tōkaidō Line operated JR Central in March 2018; Shin-Kambara Station was assigned station number CA10.

Passenger statistics
In fiscal 2017, the station was used by an average of 1,511 passengers daily (boarding passengers only).

Surrounding area
Site of Kambara Castle

See also
 List of Railway Stations in Japan

References

Yoshikawa, Fumio. Tokaido-sen 130-nen no ayumi. Grand-Prix Publishing (2002) .

External links

Official home page

Railway stations in Japan opened in 1968
Tōkaidō Main Line
Stations of Central Japan Railway Company
Railway stations in Shizuoka (city)